Rovshan Abdulla oglu Abdullaev (Born: September 28, 1978) is an Azerbaijani writer, philosopher, psychologist, and a member of PEN America.  He is the founder of the publishing house Gadim Gala, and director of the scientific department.

Biography 

Rovshan Abdulla oglu Abdullaev was born into an educated family in Baku on September 28th, 1978.                                   
His father, Abdulla Abdullaev, was then a police major and is presently a leading lawyer. He had taken part in the First Karabakh war.
His mother, Gulnara Abdullaeva, has worked in the banking sector as an accountant for about 30 years and is presently retired. 
Rovshan Abdullaoglu has two brothers:
Altai Abdullaev is a pediatrician specializing in neonatology.
Farhad Abdullaev is the co-founder and CEO of the publishing house Gadim Gala. 

He is married and has three children.

Education 
In 1995, after completing his education at the 116th secondary school, Rovshan entered the Azerbaijan State Economic University.

Thereafter, he served in the Azerbaijan border troops, receiving a personal letter of thanks from the commander of the military unit.

Rovshan Abdullaoglu continued his education in Arabic and Persian languages in the fields of theology, scholastics, Arabic literature, as well as Eastern and Western philosophy. He studied at various universities for over eight years.

In 2013, he became a licensed gestalt therapist at the Psychological Department of the Moscow Institute of Positive Technologies and Consulting.

Works 

Abdullaev published his first in book 2010, which is titled, The Veil of Light and Darkness. The book describes the factors of moral and personal development and decline, the properties of the soul and the veils of light and darkness within it.

Translations and explanations

In 2011, He started translating one of Avicenna's final books, Remarks and Admonitions (Kitab al-isharat wa al-tanbihat). In parallel with the semantic translation of the book, Rovshan Abdullaoglu provided his own interpretation of Avicenna's metaphysics and logic as two books Contemplation and On the Levels of the Mystics.

In 2012, he went on to translate the work of another famous philosopher-scientist: Muhammad Husayn Tabataba'i. The translation and interpretation of this treatise was published in three parts.

In the same year, he translated The First Book, which is considered the first manuscript in the Islamic world. It is concerned with the historical events and political backgrounds at the initial stage of the formation of an Islamic society.

Psychological works 

In his five subsequent works, Burn the Bridges behind You, Every Human a Ruler, Life Goes on no Matter What and, Rising Against All and Fears, the author turns to Western and Eastern psychology, providing new motivational levers on the material and spiritual path of personal development. These works create a synthesis of his psychological and theological views.

Fictional works 

His first psychological novel, This City is Empty, became the country's best-selling book for 2016. The author's second novel was The Man on the Rails.

Kindle editions of these psychological novels in English have been available on Amazon.com since 2018.

In March 2019 the first book entitled "Captivity" in the series of "God: Myth or Reality" has been published. It is a science book that explains the psychological reasons for ardent defense and negation of the concept of "creator" by various ideological schools.

To date, 25 books by Abdullaev have been published in Azerbaijan. Most of these have translated into English, Russian and Turkish.

In addition to writing, Abdullaev regularly performs in television programs, teaches online lessons in philosophy, and writes articles that are published on various Internet news websites.

References

External links 

 
 OLDUĞU KİMİ – Rövşən Abdullaoğlu – Pərvin İsmayılov
 Yazıçı Rövşən Abdullaoğlu TELEKİTAB verilişində

Azerbaijani male writers
1978 births
Living people